100 miles is a 2007 Emirati short comedy thriller crime film written and directed by Mustafa Abbas and starring Abbas, Mahmood Arjumand, Kurt Neyberg, and Salma Othman. The film won Best Non-Documentary at the 2007 Emirates Film Competition and was screened at the Dubai International Film Festival in 2008 as part of the Emirati Voices category.

Cast
 Mustafa Abbas as Shane 
 Mahmood Arjumand as Miles McManus Jr. 
 Kurt Neyberg as Mr. Clemens 
 Salma Othman as Annabelle James 
 Mohammed Rabi as Ted Garcia 
 Qais Rabi as Jonathan Rivers

References

External links
 
 

2007 films
2007 crime thriller films
2000s comedy thriller films
2007 short films
Emirati short films
Emirati comedy films
Emirati drama films
Emirati crime films
Emirati thriller films
2007 independent films
2007 comedy films
2000s English-language films